One of Us Is Next is a mystery thriller novel by Karen M. McManus and the sequel to One of Us Is Lying (2017). Set a year after the events of the first book, it follows three Bayview High students—Maeve Rojas, Knox Myers, and Phoebe Lawton—as an anonymous tester begins a game of truth or dare that has fatal consequences. First published on January 7, 2020, the novel has received generally positive reviews.

Plot

After the death of Simon Kelleher, creator of About That, several copycat gossip websites have appeared, though none have lasted. Maeve Rojas—sister of Bronwyn Rojas, a suspect in Simon's murder—Knox Myers—Maeve's friend and ex-boyfriend, as well as an intern at the law firm Until Proven—and Phoebe Lawton—a waitress at a local café—are juniors at Bayview High. At Until Proven, lawyer Eli Kleinfelter, who is engaged to Ashton Prentiss—sister of Addy Prentiss, another suspect in Simon's murder—has been receiving death threats.

One day, the students receive a message from an anonymous texter they call "the Unknown", who invites them to play a game of truth or dare. Phoebe is chosen as the first player. When she does not respond, the Unknown reveals the secret that she had sex with her sister Emma's boyfriend. As a result, Phoebe is slut-shamed at school and online. Maeve reaches out to her and the two become close. The following players choose dares, which are mostly harmless and humorous. When Maeve is chosen, she does not respond. The Unknown then reveals she broke up with Knox because he "could not get it up"; Knox is angered at Maeve, who realizes someone must have overheard her when she told Bronwyn at a café.

Maeve believes she is relapsing into leukaemia, but hides it. Phoebe notices Emma is becoming ill and consuming large amount of alcohol. After Nate notices her symptoms, Maeve confesses to her family about her perceived relapse. She finds she is not relapsing, however. Maeve and Knox later reconcile. Brandon, another Bayview High student, dies after jumping off a faulty landing, which Maeve, Knox, and Phoebe later find was a dare. Knox's father, who is builder, says there was intentional damage done to the landing. Meanwhile, Maeve attempts to hack into files containing information relating to a lawsuit in which Brandon was involved. After noticing the man at the restaurant and the person sending Eli death threats have the same handwriting, Knox deduces that he is named Jared, brother of a man who was prosecuted in a case Eli worked on. While he and Maeve follow him, she learns that Brandon was involved in an accident that killed Phoebe's father.

The two follow Jared to a party which Eli and other Bayview residents are attending. They find he has hidden a bomb there and throw it into the woods, reducing its damage. Later, Phoebe learns Emma, under her sister's name, planned the truth or dare game after learning about the incident with Brandon and their father. Though she claims she ghosted him when the game began, texts between the two show that she began texting him again later. Emma maintains that she did not text him again; she and Phoebe notice a writing style similar to their little brother Owen's, but do not reveal anything to the police.

Reception
The book has received positive reviews from The Guardian, Kirkus Reviews, and Common Sense Media.

References

External links

One of Us Is Lying
2020 American novels
American young adult novels
Delacorte Press books
Mystery novels
Novels set in the 21st century
Novels set in the United States
Thriller novels